Jean-Marc Beland (born ) is a Canadian male weightlifter, competing in the 77 kg category and representing Canada at international competitions. He competed at world championships, most recently at the 2014 World Weightlifting Championships.

Major results

References

1984 births
Living people
Canadian male weightlifters
Place of birth missing (living people)
Weightlifters at the 2014 Commonwealth Games
Commonwealth Games competitors for Canada
20th-century Canadian people
21st-century Canadian people